Paectes fuscescens is a moth of the family Euteliidae first described by Francis Walker in 1855. It is found from Central America to Paraguay and Brazil and on the Antilles.

References

Moths described in 1855
Euteliinae